Pavlo Hryhorovych Tychyna (– September 16, 1967) was a major Ukrainian poet, translator, publicist, public activist, academician, and statesman. He composed the lyrics to the Anthem of the Ukrainian Soviet Socialist Republic.

Life

Born in Pisky in 1891, he was baptized on January 27, which was mistakenly considered his birth date until recently. His father, Hryhoriy Timofiyovych Tychynin, was a village deacon and a teacher in the local grammar school. His mother, Maria Vasylivna Tychynina (Savytska), was eleven years younger than Pavlo's father. Pavlo had nine siblings: five sisters and four brothers. At first young Tychyna studied at the district's elementary school which was opened in Pisky in 1897. His first teacher was Serafima Morachevska who later recommended him to try his talent in chorus. In 1900 he became a member of an archiary chorus in the Trinity (Troitsky) monastery near Chernihiv. Simultaneously young Tychyna studied in the Chernihiv theological school. In 1906 Pavlo's father died. In 1907 Pavlo finished his school.

In 1907-1913 Tychyna continued his education in the Chernihiv Theological Seminary. There he became friends with the future poet, Vasyl Ellan-Blakytny. He also met Mykhailo Kotsiubynsky who greatly influenced his early works. In 1912-1913 Tychyna's works get published in the various local publications. In 1913-1917 he was studying at the Economics department of the Kyiv Commercial Institute which he did not finish. At the same time, he worked on the editorial boards of the Kyiv newspaper Rada and the magazine Svitlo (1913–14). In summers he worked for the Chernihiv statistical bureau. Later he worked as the assistant to chorus-meister in the Mykola Sadovsky theater.

When World War I broke out the institute transferred to Saratov. Tychyna, whilst on the road to the institute's new location, became ill and was forced to stop and recover from his sickness. He found sanctuary at the house of another poet, Volodymyr Samiylenko, in Dobrianka. During the war he worked with various Ukrainian publications.  In 1920 Pavlo became a member of Pluh. After an immediate success with his poetry, in 1923 he moved to Kharkiv (Kharkov), entering the vibrant world of early post-Revolution Ukrainian literary organizations. In 1923 he joined the organization Hart after moving to Kharkivn and in 1927 the famed VAPLITE. In the 1920s Tychyna was a member of Kharkiv city council as an independent. Controversy about the ideological tendencies of VAPLITE and the content of several of Tychyna's poems led to him being criticized for ideological reasons. As a response, Tychyna stopped writing and everybody assumed that it was the end to his writings. Later he became a member of Chervonyi Shliakh, and started to study Armenian, Georgian, and Turkic language, and became the activist of the Association of Eastern Studies in Kyiv.

Work
His initial work had strong connections to the symbolist literary movement, but his style transformed a number of times during his long career and frequently aped the acceptable socialist realism. His first works exploded onto the avant-garde Ukrainian scene with their colorful imagery and dynamic rhythms. However, as the Communist approach to artistic expression hardened and the role of a state-supported artist became more defined and restricted, Tychyna's poetry shifted rather dramatically, using clear pro-Communist political language, including a famous ode to Joseph Stalin, and the lyrics of the state anthem of the Ukrainian SSR. In 1933 the newspaper Pravda published his poem "The Party leads" in the Ukrainian language. Tychyna was often criticized by Ukrainian exiles for the praising of Communism in his work and co-option by the regime, but recent scholarship has stressed his subtle distancing and mocking of Communist excesses and brutality through over-the-top suffusive praise.

Controversy
Tychyna represents a complicated figure in both a political and academic sense. Many Ukrainian exile intellectuals and scholars involved in the analysis of Ukrainian literary history could not accept Tychyna's submission to political authority and apparent abandonment of many of his literary companions to the horrors of Stalinism. The true merit of his later poetry has been difficult to judge in such a bitter environment, which is only now relaxing. It also becomes difficult to determine Tychyna's true intent and emotions in such a repressive environment.

Tychyna's willingness to work with authorities, however, did not prevent Soviet authorities from forcing him to write a letter rejecting his candidature for a Nobel Prize, likely due to his Ukrainian heritage.

Tychyna was nominated for the Nobel Prize in Literature in 1967 by Omeljan Pritsak, but died in September that year.

Major works
Clarinets of the Sun, (1918)
The Plow, (1919)
Instead of Sonnets or Octaves, (1920)
The Wind from Ukraine, (1924)
Chernihiv, (1931)
The Party is our Guide (1934)
Feelings of One Unified Family, (1938)
Song of Youth, (1938)
Steel and Tenderness, (1941)
We Are Going into Battle, (1941)
Patriotism in works of Majit Gafuri, (1942)
Funeral of a Friend, (1942)
The Day Will Come, (1943)
To Grow and Act (1949)

English translations 
The poems of Pavlo Tychyna were translated into English by Stephen Komarnyckyj.
 Tychyna Pavlo. The Raspberry’s Eyelash. Translated and edited by Stephen Komarnyckyj. — Salzburg: Poetry Salzburg at the University of Salzburg, 2012. 120 pp. 
 Translations by Virlana Tkacz and Wanda Phipps

Awards
 Stalin Prize 1941 for collection of poetry "A feeling of the family united" (“Чуття єдиної родини”)
 Shevchenko National Prize 1962 (along with Oleksandr Honchar and Platon Maiboroda) for selected works in three volumes (1957)
 Hero of Socialist Labor February 23, 1967 for literary and civic activity
 Order Red Banner of Labour (twice)
 Order of Lenin (five times)
 Gold medal "Sickle and Hammer"

Legacy
Street names
 Kyiv
 Chernihiv
 Ivano-Frankivsk
 Vanadzor, Armenia
Memorial plaques
 Kyiv (at 5 Tereshchenko Street, also opened a museum-apartment of Tychyna)
 Kharkiv
 Ufa (at 79 Pushkin Street)
 Chernihiv (on building of the former Theological Seminary)
Monuments
 Pisky village (bust)
Museums
 Pavlo Tychyna Museum in Kyiv

References

External links
 
 Biography at the Communist Party of Ukraine website
 Tychyna, Pavlo in Encyclopedia of Ukraine

1891 births
1967 deaths
People from Chernihiv Oblast
People from Chernigov Governorate
Ukrainian people in the Russian Empire
Soviet male poets
Ukrainian male poets
20th-century male writers
Soviet politicians
20th-century Ukrainian poets
Chairmen of the Verkhovna Rada of the Ukrainian Soviet Socialist Republic
First convocation members of the Verkhovna Rada of the Ukrainian Soviet Socialist Republic
Second convocation members of the Verkhovna Rada of the Ukrainian Soviet Socialist Republic
Third convocation members of the Verkhovna Rada of the Ukrainian Soviet Socialist Republic
Fourth convocation members of the Verkhovna Rada of the Ukrainian Soviet Socialist Republic
Fifth convocation members of the Verkhovna Rada of the Ukrainian Soviet Socialist Republic
Sixth convocation members of the Verkhovna Rada of the Ukrainian Soviet Socialist Republic
Seventh convocation members of the Verkhovna Rada of the Ukrainian Soviet Socialist Republic
Communist Party of Ukraine (Soviet Union) politicians
Education ministers of the Ukrainian Soviet Socialist Republic
20th-century Ukrainian politicians
Recipients of the Shevchenko National Prize
Stalin Prize winners
Corresponding Members of the Bulgarian Academy of Sciences
Burials at Baikove Cemetery